Brocato's may refer to:

 Angelo Brocato's or Angelo Brocato's Italian Ice Cream Parlor, in New Orleans, Louisiana
 Brocato's Sandwich Shop in Tampa, Florida